The Tonight Belongs to You Tour was the first headlining concert tour by American boy band In Real Life. The tour began on September 9, 2018, in Silver Spring, and concluded November 11, 2018, in Cebu City.

Background and development 
On June 4, 2018, In Real Life announced they would be embarking on a 15-date North American tour. JAGMAC and Spencer Sutherland were announced as opening acts. In August, more North American dates were added. That same month, six dates in the Philippines were announced.

Setlist 
This setlist is representative of the show on September 12, 2018, in Boston. It does not represent all the shows from the tour.

 "Eyes Closed"
 "How Badly"
 "Motownphilly" / "I Want It That Way" / "Bye Bye Bye" / "Glad You Came" / "Burnin' Up / "What Makes You Beautiful"
 "Amnesia"
 "Mirrors"
 "Viva la Vida"
 "Someone Like You"
 "Got Me Good"
 Freestyle rap
 "Familiar"
 "Sweet Creature"
 "Stay"
 "Beautiful"
 "Tattoo (How 'Bout You)"
 "Drag Me Down"
 "Tonight Belongs to You"
 "The Show Goes On"

Tour dates

References 

2018 concert tours